Adam Shaw may refer to:
Adam Shaw (journalist), British business journalist and presenter
Adam Shaw (painter) (born 1957), American painter
Adam Shaw, musician in Lost City Angels

See also
Adam Shore, American singer